The 1892 United States presidential election in Maine took place on November 8, 1892, as part of the 1892 United States presidential election. Voters chose six representatives, or electors to the Electoral College, who voted for president and vice president.

Maine voted for the Republican nominee, incumbent President Benjamin Harrison, over the Democratic nominee, former President Grover Cleveland, who was running for a second, non-consecutive term. Harrison won the state by a margin of 12.79%.

With 54.05% of the popular vote, Maine would prove to be Harrison's second strongest victory in terms of percentage of the popular vote after Vermont.

Results

Results by county

See also
 United States presidential elections in Maine

References

Maine
1892
1892 Maine elections